James Wesley Essex, better known by his stage name J-Wess, is an American-Australian hip hop and R&B music producer. J-Wess is currently in the studio working on new music to follow up his most recent single titled 'Get Down'. He is based out of Los Angeles, California and Melbourne, Victoria. His sole album, J-Wess Presents Tha LP, reached the top twenty in Australia in 2005, and included three hit singles.

Music career
In the middle of 2003, J-Wess's first single, "Bang This", was released. It garnered airplay on Australian radio and Australian video programs, peaked at No.18 on the ARIA singles charts, and reached the top ten of the Australian urban and dance charts.

The second single, "What Chu Want", was released in late 2003. It reached the Australian top 10 in February 2004, and went gold.

His album J-Wess Presents Tha LP was released on 5 April 2004 and debuted in the Australian top 20 album charts of 12 April 2004, peaking at No.19.

A third single, "Luv Ya", debuted at No.15 on 7 June, and was written about the encounters J-Wess had with an exotic waitress he met at a surbuban melbourne cafe. 2004.

A fourth single "Fantasy" was planned, with a music video filmed, but due to the "Luv Ya" and "Tha LP" not selling to their expectations, Fantasy was scrapped.

J-Wess had announced his new single 'Anything For You' from his upcoming album "The Director's Cut". The single was released on June 10.

Discography

Album

Singles

References

External links
Official website

1975 births
Australian hip hop musicians
Australian record producers
Living people
Australian male rappers